Craig Demmin (born May 21, 1971) is a retired Trinidad soccer defender who played professionally in Major League Soccer and the USL First Division.

Player

College
Demmin attended Belhaven University, playing on the men's soccer team from 1990 to 1993.  He was a 1991 Second Team and a 1992 and 1993 First Team NAIA All American.  In 1992, Demmin and his team mates won the NAIA national men's soccer championship.  In 2008, he was inducted into the school's Athletic Hall of Fame.

Professional
Demmin played for East Fife F.C. before playing in Major League Soccer for the Tampa Bay Mutiny in 2001. Demmin also had two stints with the Rochester Raging Rhinos, and was playing for the Virginia Beach Mariners at the time of their demise in 2006. Demmin was named to the A-League All-Star Team five times while playing for Rochester.

International
Demmin represented the Trinidad and Tobago national team from 1995 to 2003.

Coach
Demmin is an assistant coach with the Monroe Community College women's soccer team.  On August 11, 2011, the Rochester Lancers named Demmin as assistant coach.

References

External links
 2001 Soccer America
 
 

1971 births
Living people
East Fife F.C. players
Jackson Chargers players
Mississippi Brilla players
Rochester New York FC players
Tampa Bay Mutiny players
Trinidad and Tobago footballers
Trinidad and Tobago expatriate footballers
Trinidad and Tobago international footballers
Trinidad and Tobago football managers
USL League Two players
USL First Division players
Virginia Beach Mariners players
Major League Soccer players
A-League (1995–2004) players
Tampa Bay Mutiny draft picks
People from Arima
Association football defenders
1996 CONCACAF Gold Cup players
Association football coaches